Bonaventure (later known as Bonaventure—Îles-de-la-Madeleine) was a federal electoral district in the province of Quebec, Canada, that was represented in the House of Commons of Canada from 1867 to 1997. It was created as "Bonaventure" riding by the British North America Act, 1867.

History
In 1933, it was defined to consist of the county of Bonaventure and the municipalities of Ste-Florence, Ste-Marguerite-Marie and Causapscal (parish and village) in the county of Matapedia.

In 1947, it was redefined to consist only of the county of Bonaventure.

In 1952, parts of the county of Matapédia were added: the townships of Assemetquagan and Milnikek, the projected township of Roncevaux and, the township of Assemetquagan in the municipality of Saint-Fidèle-de-Ristigouche.

In 1966, it was defined to consist of the Counties of Bonaventure and Iles-de-la-Madeleine and the Townships of Milnikek and Assemetquagan in the County of Matapédia.

In 1976, it was defined to consist of: 
the Towns of Carleton, Causapscal and New Richmond;
 the Counties of Bonaventure and Iles-de-la-Madeleine; and
 in the County of Matapédia: the parish municipalities of Saint-Jacques-le-Majeur-de-Causapscal and Saint-Raphaël-d'Albertville; the municipalities of Saint-Edmond, Sainte-Florence and Sainte-Marguerite; the Township of Milnikek and that part of the Township of Assemetquagan without local municipal organization.

In 1987, it was defined to consist of 
 the towns of Carleton and New Richmond;
 the County of Bonaventure excluding the following: the Parish Municipality of Sainte-Germaine-de-l'Anseaux-Gascons; the Township Municipality of Port-Daniel-Partie-Est; the Territory of Bonaventure-Routhierville portion; and
 the County of Iles-de-la-Madeleine.

The riding's name was changed to "Bonaventure—Îles-de-la-Madeleine" in 1971.

The district was amalgamated into the Gaspé—Bonaventure—Îles-de-la-Madeleine electoral district in 1996.

Members of Parliament

This riding elected the following Members of Parliament:

Election results

Bonaventure

Bonaventure—Îles-de-la-Madeleine

See also 

 List of Canadian federal electoral districts
 Past Canadian electoral districts

References

External links 

Riding history from the Library of Parliament:
Bonaventure
Bonaventure—Îles-de-la-Madeleine

Former federal electoral districts of Quebec